Iran national cerebral palsy football team is the national cerebral football team for Iran that represents the team in international competitions.  The team did not compete at the 2015 IFCPF World Championships.  At the 2011 World Championships, they finished second.  In the country's three Paralympic appearances, they won bronze in 2008 and 2012, and finished fifth in 2004.

Background 
Islamic Republic of Iran Sports Federation for the Disabled is in charge of managing the national team. During the 2000s, the team was one of the top four most dominant teams in the world alongside Brazil, Ukraine and Russia. In 2012, the team was coached by Amin Allahmani. National team development is supported by an International Federation of Cerebral Palsy Football (IFCPF) recognized national championship.  Recognized years for the national IFCPF recognized competition include  2011, 2013, 2014, and 2015. Iran was active internationally by 2016, and had national championships to support national team player development.

In 2016, after getting an endorsement by the World AntiDoping Agency (WADA), the IFCPF Anti-Doping Code was formally amended to allow for out of competition testing.  This was done through a WADA approved Whereabouts Programme managed through ADAMS. Drawing from players in a  Registered Testing Pool, players from this country were included ahead of the 2016 Summer Paralympics in Rio.

Ranking 

Iran was ranked twelfth in the world by the IFCPF in 2016. The team is also ranked first regionally in Asia-Oceania. In August 2013 and November 2014, the team was ranked fifth. Iran was ranked third in July 2011 and September 2012.

Players 
There have been a number of players for the Iranian squad.

Results 

Iran has participated in a number of international tournaments. Iran won the 2014 Asian Para Games after defeating Japan 5 - 0 in the final. The team was scheduled to participate in the 2016 IFCPF Qualification Tournament World Championships in Vejen, Denmark in early August.  The tournament was part of the qualifying process for the 2017 IFCPF World Championships.  Other teams scheduled to participate included Scotland, Canada, Portugal, Northern Ireland, Australia, Venezuela, Japan, Republic of South Korea, Germany, Denmark, and Spain. They won the event with five straight victories.

IFCPF World Championships 
Iran has participated in the IFCPF World Championships.  The country was supposed to participate in the 2015 edition, but because of visa issues were unable to do so.

Paralympic Games 

Iran has participated in 7-a-side football at the Paralympic Games.

Paralympic Results

2016 Games
Iran had missed out on qualification for Rio initially because they had visa issues that did not allow them to participate in the IFCPF World Championships, and there were not enough teams to allow for a viable Asian qualifying competition. They were included following the suspension of Russia. The IFCPF said in their rationale for picking Iran that it would increase continental inclusion from 2 to 3, and they would be replacing one potential medalist with another potential medalist.  They go to the Rio Games having won the 2016 IFCPF Qualification Tournament World Championships in Vejen, Denmark  a month earlier.

References 

Cerebral Palsy
Iran at the Paralympics
National cerebral palsy football teams
Football 7-a-side teams at the 2004 Summer Paralympics
Football 7-a-side teams at the 2008 Summer Paralympics
Football 7-a-side teams at the 2012 Summer Paralympics
Football 7-a-side teams at the 2016 Summer Paralympics